The women's 10,000 metres event at the 1987 Summer Universiade was held at the Stadion Maksimir in Zagreb on 14 July 1987.

Results

References

Athletics at the 1987 Summer Universiade
1987